Dormition of the Theotokos Church ( / Tsŭrkva Sv. Uspenie Bogorodichno) is an Eastern Orthodox church building in Targovishte. It is one of the finest examples of the middle and late Bulgarian National Revival church architecture.

The building is situated in the Varosha Quarter - the old town in Targovishte.
The church was built in the period 1847–1851 by Usta Dimitar from the Tryavna School. Initially the bell tower was a wooden structure next to the building. The three-naved church is built from stone on 510 sq.m. In 1860, the interior decoration, including the chancel-screen, was made, again by artists from the Tryavna School. In the very beginning of the 20th century the present elegant bell tower was added by Gencho Novakov, on a design by the Italian Paul Forlani.

Gallery

References
The church on journey.bg 

Bulgarian Orthodox churches in Bulgaria
Buildings and structures in Targovishte Province
Targovishte
19th-century Eastern Orthodox church buildings